Mansfield Town Football Club is an English association football club based in the Nottinghamshire town of Mansfield. Founded in 1897 as Mansfield Wesleyans, the team first entered the Mansfield & District Amateur League in 1902. Four years later, the club turned professional, tweaked its name to Mansfield Wesley, and joined the Notts & District League. The team made their debut in the FA Cup in 1909–10, and joined the Central Alliance in 1911, by which time the club had adopted its current name of Mansfield Town. In the first post-First World War season, they moved to the Field Mill ground and won the Central Alliance title, and in 1921, they were accepted into the Midland League. Three years later, they won the Midland League title, repeated the feat the following year, and were runners-up the next. Applications for election to the Football League were unsuccessful, but in the hope of a better class of football, they had one season in the Midland Combination, primarily a reserve league for Football League clubs, before returning to the Midland League. In 1928–29, Mansfield won the Midland League title by a nine-point margin and beat two Football League clubs on the way to their first appearance in the fourth round of the FA Cup, in which they lost 2–0 to Arsenal at Highbury.

Geographically, Mansfield lay on the border between the catchment areas of the Northern and Southern sections of the regionalised Third Division of the League. They had previously applied for election to the Northern Section; for the 1931–32 season, they applied to the Southern Section, and were admitted. After one season, in which they struggled, the team was reallocated to the Northern Section, before returning to the Southern in 1937. Competitive football was suspended for the duration of the Second World War. Mansfield finished 22nd and bottom in the first post-war season, and thus had to apply for re-election to the League. The management committee decided that in light of the difficult circumstances facing all clubs in resuming competitive professional football after the war, all clubs facing re-election should be accepted unopposed. Mansfield were transferred to the Northern Section for 1947–48. Three seasons later, they finished runners-upat that time, only the champions were promotedand reached the fifth round (last 16) of the FA Cup for the first time, losing to First Division team and eventual cup finalists Blackpool. Against a background of financial and governance problems that brought the club close to bankruptcy, Mansfield remained in the Northern Section until the regional sections were amalgamated into national Third and Fourth Divisions in 1958, when they were placed in the Third Division.

Two years later, Mansfield were relegated for the first time in their history. In their third season in the fourth tier, they finished fourth and were promoted on goal average, ahead of Gillingham by 0.118 of a goal. After a further nine years in the Thirdduring which time they reached the 1968–69 FA Cup quarter-final, which remains their best achievement in the competitionand three in the Fourth Divisions, Mansfield won their first title at Football League level, taking the 1974–75 Fourth Division by a six-point margin. A season of consolidation, whose highlights included progressing to the quarter-final of the League Cup and the first of two Anglo-Scottish Cup semi-finals, preceded another championship: the 1976–77 Third Division title gained Mansfield promotion to the Football League Second Division for the first and as yet only time. They could not maintain that status, and for the next thirty years continued to drift between third and fourth tiers, during which time they won the 1986–87 Associate Members' Cup, a cup competition open to teams from the lowest two tiers of the League; Mansfield beat Bristol City in a penalty shoot-out in the final. In 2007–08, they finished 23rd in the fourth tier and were relegated out of the Football League into the Conference National (promotion and relegation between League and Conference had replaced re-election in 1987). They reached the final of the 2010–11 FA Trophy, losing to Darlington in the last minute of extra time, before returning to the League as Conference champions in 2013.

Since their admission to the Football League, Mansfield Town have spent 1 season in the second tier of the English football league system, 42 in the third, 36 in the fourth, and 5 in the top tier of non-league football. The table details the team's achievements in senior first-team competitions and their top league goalscorers from their debut season in the Mansfield & District Amateur League in 1902–03 to the end of the most recently completed season.

Key

Key to league record:
P – Played
W – Games won
D – Games drawn
L – Games lost
F – Goals for
A – Goals against
Pts – Points
Pos – Final position

Key to divisions:
M&D Am – Mansfield & District Amateur League
Notts – Notts & District League
Cent All – Central Alliance
Notts/Derbys – Notts & Derbyshire League
Yorks – Yorkshire Football League
Div 2 – Football League Second Division
Div 3 – Football League Third Division
Div 4 – Football League Fourth Division
League 1 – Football League One
League 2 – EFL League Two

Key to rounds:
Group – Group stage
Prelim – Preliminary round
QR1 – First qualifying round
QR2 – Second qualifying round, etc.
Inter – Intermediate round (between qualifying rounds and rounds proper)
R1 – First round
R2 – Second round, etc.
QF – Quarter-final
SF – Semi-final
F – Final
W – Winners
(N) – Northern section of regionalised stage
(S) – Southern section of regionalised stage

Details of the abandoned 1939–40 Football League season are shown in italics and appropriately footnoted.

Seasons

Notes

References
General
 
Specific

External links
Mansfield Town F.C. official website

Seasons
 
English football club seasons